Johann Salomo Christoph Schweigger (8 April 1779 – 6 September 1857) was a German chemist, physicist, and professor of mathematics born in Erlangen.

J.S.C.Schweigger was the son of Friedrich Christian Lorenz Schweigger, professor of theologie in Erlangen (1786 until his death in 1802). He studied philosophy in Erlangen. His PhD involved the Homeric Question revived at that time by Friedrich August Wolf. Johann Tobias Mayer, Georg Friedrich Hildebrandt and Karl Christian von Langsdorf convinced him to switch to physics and chemistry and he lectured on this subjects in Erlangen until 1803 before taking a position as schoolteacher in Bayreuth and in 1811 in Nuremberg. During 1816-1819 he was appointed professor of philosophy in Erlangen teaching physics and chemistry. 1816 he was elected member of the Leopoldina. 1819 he moved on to the university of Halle.

In 1820 he built the first sensitive galvanometer, naming it after Luigi Galvani. He created this instrument, acceptable for actual measurement as well as detection of small amounts of electric current, by wrapping a coil of wire around a graduated compass. The instrument was initially called a multiplier.

He is the father of Karl Ernst Theodor Schweigger and adopted one of his students Franz Wilhelm Schweigger-Seidel as his own son.

Written works 
 Einleitung in die Mythologie auf dem Standpunkte der Naturwissenschaft, Halle (1836) - Introduction to mythology, from the standpoint of natural science.
 Über naturwissenschaftliche Mysterien in ihrem Verhältnis zur Litteratur des Altertums, Halle (1843) - Involving scientific mysteries in their relation to the literature of antiquity. 
 Über das Elektron der Alten, Greifswald (1848) - On the electron of the past.
 Über die stöchiometrischen Reihen, Halle (1853) - On the stoichiometry series.

References
J. S. C. Schweigger: His Romanticism and His Crystal Electrical Theory of Matter by H. A. M. Snelders (1971)

External links

 (German)

1779 births
1857 deaths
19th-century German chemists
19th-century German inventors
19th-century German physicists
People from Erlangen
People from the Principality of Bayreuth
University of Erlangen-Nuremberg alumni
Academic staff of the Martin Luther University of Halle-Wittenberg
19th-century German mathematicians